The Women's long jump competition at the 2000 Summer Olympics in Sydney, Australia was held at the Stadium Australia on 29 September 2000.

Italian Fiona May finished in second, while American Marion Jones claimed the third place. On 5 October 2007, Jones admitted that she had taken performance-enhancing drugs. As a result, she was disqualified and the International Olympic Committee (IOC) stripped her of bronze medal on 9 December. Russian Tatyana Kotova, who originally finished in fourth place, was instead awarded the bronze. Kotova was later found guilty of doping, but her Olympic results were unaffected.

Schedule
All times are Australian Eastern Standard Time (UTC+10)

Abbreviations
All results shown are in metres

Records

Qualifying 
Held on Wednesday 27 September 2000.

The qualifying distance was 6.70m. For all qualifiers who did not achieve the standard, the remaining spaces in the final were filled by the longest jumps until a total of 12 qualifiers.

Group A

Group B

Overall Qualifying

Final

See also
 1996 Women's Olympic Long Jump (Atlanta)
 1997 Women's World Championships Long Jump (Athens)
 1998 Women's European Championships Long Jump (Budapest)
 1999 Women's World Championships Long Jump (Seville)
 2001 Women's World Championships Long Jump (Edmonton)
 2002 Women's European Championships Long Jump (Munich)
 2004 Women's Olympic Long Jump (Athens)

References

External links
 Results
 Source: Official Report of the 2000 Sydney Summer Olympics available at https://web.archive.org/web/20080522105330/http://www.la84foundation.org/5va/reports_frmst.htm

L
Long jump at the Olympics
2000 in women's athletics
Women's events at the 2000 Summer Olympics